Rinse is an album by Minotaur Shock, released in 2003.

Track listing
"46 Tops" – 3:25
"Stack On Rat" – 4:15
"Don't Be A Slave To No Computer" – 7:00
"Let Me Out" – 3:54
"The Downs" – 4:50
"Albert Park Music" – 9:50
"Motoring Britain" – 6:14
"Avon Ranger" – 6:25
"Repertor" – 4:17
"Rockpoolin'" – 5:44
"Lady Came From Battic Wharf (W/Sui Said Love)" – 6:22

References

Minotaur Shock albums
2003 albums